John Thomas "Tug" Arundel (June 30, 1862 – September 5, 1912) was an American Major League Baseball catcher born in Romulus, New York.

Career
He made his debut at the age of 19 in 1882, playing in one game for the Philadelphia Athletics on May 23, and went hitless in five at bats. Two years later he played sparingly for the Toledo Blue Stockings, the team that included the first African-American major league baseball players, Fleetwood and Welday Walker. It wasn't  that he received significant playing time, when he hit .197 in 157 at-bats for the Indianapolis Hoosiers. Overall, he played in 76 career games, collecting 45 hits in 260 at-bats for a .173 batting average. He hit four doubles, one triple and no home runs in his career.

He died at the age of 50 from the effects of paralysis in Auburn, New York, and is interred there at St. Joseph Cemetery.

References

External links

1862 births
1912 deaths
Baseball players from New York (state)
People from Romulus, New York
Philadelphia Athletics (AA) players
Toledo Blue Stockings players
Indianapolis Hoosiers (NL) players
Washington Nationals (1886–1889) players
19th-century baseball players
Major League Baseball catchers
East Saginaw Grays players
Peoria Reds players
Saginaw Greys players
Milwaukee Brewers (minor league) players
Memphis Reds players
Eau Claire Lumbermen players
Chattanooga Lookouts players
Savannah (minor league baseball) players
St. Louis Whites players
Saginaw (minor league baseball) players
Saginaw-Bay City Hyphens players
Detroit Wolverines (minor league) players
Major League Baseball umpires
Burials in New York (state)